Centurione I Zaccaria (1336–1376) was a powerful noble in the Principality of Achaea in Frankish Greece. In 1345 he succeeded his father, Martino Zaccaria, as baron of Damala and lord of one half of the Barony of Chalandritsa, and in 1359 he acquired the other half. In about 1370 he was named Grand Constable of Achaea and received also the Barony of Estamira. He also thrice held the post of bailli (viceroy) for the principality's Angevin rulers. 

He died in 1376/77, during his third bailliage.

By his marriage to Helene Asanina, daughter of Andronicus Asen  from Asanes family, he had the following children:
 Andronikos Asanes Zaccaria de Damala, Baron of Chalandritsa and Arcadia, father of Centurione II Zaccaria, Prince of Achaea in 1404–1432.
 Filippo Asanes Zaccaria de Damala, married the heiress of Rhiolo in Morea.
 Martino Asanes Zaccaria de Damala, known only from his participation in the Battle of Gardiki in 1375.
 Manuele Asanes Zaccaria de Damala, married Eliana Cattaneo.
 Maria II Zaccaria de Damala, married Pedro de San Superano, Prince of Achaea in 1396–1402; regent of Achaea in 1402–1404.

Notes

Sources
 

1336 births
1376 deaths
Baillis of the Principality of Achaea
Barons of Veligosti-Damala
Centurione 01
14th-century people from the Principality of Achaea